Autosticha banauscopa is a moth in the family Autostichidae. It was described by Edward Meyrick in 1929. It is found on the islands of Vanuatu.

The wingspan is 10–11 mm. The forewings are light greyish ochreous or whitish ochreous, more or less densely irrorated (sprinkled) with dark fuscous, especially posteriorly. The costal edge is ochreous whitish, with a fuscous dot beyond the middle. The stigmata are cloudy, dark fuscous, variable in distinctness, the plical somewhat obliquely before the first discal. There is an almost marginal series of cloudy dark fuscous dots around the posterior part of the costa and termen. The hindwings are grey.

References

Moths described in 1929
Autosticha
Moths of Oceania